Dr. Mahar Mangahas is the president of Philippine-based opinion survey firm Social Weather Stations (SWS). A former professor of economics at the University of the Philippines Diliman, he earned his Ph.D. in Economics from the University of Chicago under the tutelage of Milton Friedman (Nobel Prize in Economic Science,1974).  The Filipino economic and social indicators expert also writes for the Philippine Daily Inquirer.

Career
Dr. Mangahas wrote books such as Measuring the quality of life: Philippine social indicators, Labor absorption in Philippine agriculture, and The political economy of land reform and land distribution in the Philippines. Before he joined to do full-time work at SWS, he had a teaching stint at the School of Economics of the University of the Philippines.

References
 https://web.archive.org/web/20120423142419/http://www.sws.org.ph/spotlite.htm
 

20th-century Filipino economists
Living people
University of Chicago alumni
Academic staff of the University of the Philippines
Year of birth missing (living people)